A by-election was held in the 12th district of Bangkok on 16 June 2013.

Candidates 
 Bhuddhichad Chuyram Seri Tham Party Number 1
 Pangsri Pijarn New-Democracy Party Number 2
 Weerapol Suthipornparangkoon  Tuangkuenpeanpha Thailand Party Number 3
 Phattanapong Kasemwan Energy Thai Party Number 4
 Noppadol Chairitthidech Unity Nation Party Number 5
 Thanawit Palakawong Na-Ayutthaya Puea Pandin Party Number 6
 Witthaya Raksathip Palang Sahakorn Party Number 7
 Tankhun Jitt-itsara Democrat Party (Thailand) Number 8
 Yuranunt Pamornmontri Pheu Thai Party Number 9

References 

Thailand
By-election
By-elections in Thailand